Liberty Union High School District is a public school district based in northeastern Contra Costa County, California.

The communities it serves include Brentwood, the majority of Oakley, a section of Antioch, the CDPs of Byron, Discovery Bay and Knightsen and Bethel Island.

Schools:
 Freedom High School (Oakley)
 Heritage High School (Brentwood)
 Independence High School (Brentwood)
 La Paloma High School (Brentwood)
 Liberty High School (Brentwood)

References

External links
 

School districts in Contra Costa County, California
Brentwood, California